The Hamilton Avenue murders is the colloquial name for the mass murder of seven people in a house at 560 North Hamilton Avenue in Indianapolis, Indiana, on June 1, 2006.

Incident
According to the television program America's Most Wanted, the Indianapolis Police Department responded to a 911 call just after 10:00 p.m. They found seven dead victims, three of whom were children. The victims were shot with a military-style weapon, police charged. Evidence technicians recovered 23 discharged 7.62x39mm cartridge casings from the scene. These cartridges accommodate high velocity bullets used in AK-47 and SKS-type rifles.

Witnesses said two suspects were seen entering the house shortly before the murders were believed to have taken place. Flora Albarran arrived with a friend to pick up her son around 10:00 p.m. Albarran's brother, Magno, also arrived about the same time. Both noticed that the house lights were out, which they knew was odd. When Flora Albarran entered, witnesses said she screamed to her friend not to come in. The suspects were seen leaving through the front door moments later.

Victims
The victims were identified as:

 Emma Valdez, 46
 Alberto Covarrubias, 56, Valdez's husband
 Flora Albarran, 22, Valdez's daughter
 Magno Albarran, 29, Valdez's son, Flora Albarran's brother
 Luis Albarran, 5, Flora Albarran's son
 David Covarrubias, 8, Valdez's son
 Alberto Covarrubias, 11, Valdez's son

Perpetrators 
Police identified the suspects as James Stewart and Desmond Turner.

Stewart was arrested without incident the following day. Turner, who had finished a four-year stint in prison only six months before, was the subject of a widespread manhunt by local, state, and federal authorities. He was captured on June 3, two days after the murders, when he turned himself in without incident at a Hardee's restaurant on Indianapolis's east side.

Prosecutors charged Turner and Stewart with seven counts of murder, seven counts of felony murder, seven counts of criminal confinement, robbery, burglary, carrying a handgun without a license (Stewart), and unlawful possession of a firearm by a serious violent felon (Stewart). Prosecutors originally sought the death penalty against Turner, but eventually dropped that request and sought a sentence of life without parole in exchange for Turner agreeing to waive his right to a trial by jury and instead be tried before a judge only. Both suspects maintained their innocence, but Stewart's girlfriend claimed that he admitted his role in the shootings.

Turner was convicted of seven counts of felony murder, seven counts of criminal confinement, burglary, and robbery and was sentenced on November 20, 2009, to life imprisonment without parole plus 88 years. On September 28, 2011, the Indiana Supreme Court unanimously affirmed Turner's convictions and sentence in full.

Stewart was convicted of seven counts of felony murder, six counts of criminal confinement, robbery, burglary, carrying a handgun without a license, and being a habitual offender; he was sentenced on January 6, 2010 to 425 years in prison. On April 18, 2011, the Indiana Court of Appeals affirmed all of Stewart's convictions and sentences except for the robbery conviction and resulting four-year sentence, which it vacated because that conviction violated the constitutional protections against double jeopardy. The opinion left Stewart with a 425-year aggregate sentence. The Indiana Supreme Court denied a review of the Stewart appeal on September 28, 2011, the same day it rejected Turner's appeal.

Aftermath
The house was set on fire in an arson attack on August 23, 2008. It was demolished on July 16, 2010.

References

2006 in Indiana
2006 mass shootings in the United States
2006 murders in the United States
2000s in Indianapolis
21st-century mass murder in the United States
Deaths by firearm in Indiana
Family murders
June 2006 crimes
June 2006 events in the United States
Mass murder in 2006
Mass murder in Indiana
Mass shootings in Indiana
Mass shootings in the United States
Murder in Indianapolis